The McLean County Courthouse in Washburn, North Dakota was built in 1908. It was a -story brick building with a central tower above the front entrance. It was listed on the National Register of Historic Places in 1985. The listing included two contributing buildings.

It was designed by the Hancock Brothers architectural firm from Fargo, North Dakota. The courthouse replaced a previous courthouse built in 1905.

Because of health concerns in the old building, county voters in 2010 approved the construction of a new courthouse. The 1908 courthouse was demolished in 2013.

See also
Former McLean County Courthouse, also NRHP-listed

References

Courthouses on the National Register of Historic Places in North Dakota
County courthouses in North Dakota
Government buildings completed in 1908
Buildings and structures demolished in 2013
National Register of Historic Places in McLean County, North Dakota
1908 establishments in North Dakota
2013 disestablishments in North Dakota
Demolished buildings and structures in North Dakota